= Emmons Creek =

Stream in Wisconsin, U.S.

Coordinates: 44°19′22″N 89°11′01″W

Emmons Creek is a stream in the U.S. state of Wisconsin. It empties into Long Lake. Emmons Creek most likely was named after the local Emmons family; an earlier name was "Robinson's Creek".
